Moisés Solana Arciniega (December 26, 1935 – July 27, 1969) was a Mexican racing driver. He participated in eight Formula One World Championship Grands Prix, debuting on October 27, 1963, and scoring no championship points. He also participated in one non-Championship Formula One race. His first racing events were in a 1954 special (the "Solana Sports"), built by Javiér Solana. Solana was also a proficient Jai alai player and his racing career was partly funded by this.

In 1968, Solana tested a Formula Two car for Ferrari. He also drove for Lola and McLaren in the USRRC/Can-Am series between 1966 and 1968, and in March 1968 he won the first point-scoring race of the USRRC Group 7 series in the first international race in Mexico City. He still holds all the records in the Mexican road race categories and those at the Mexican Magdalena Mixhuca circuit.

He was the only driver in the history of the Formula One World Championship to start a race in a number 13 car (Divina Galica, in the 1976 British Grand Prix, also attempted a race with the number, but failed to qualify), something he did for BRM on his Formula One debut in the 1963 Mexican Grand Prix until Pastor Maldonado adopted 13 as his permanent number in 2014. Solana was a classified finisher in 11th despite his engine having failed eight laps short of the chequered flag.

On July 27, 1969, Solana was killed in the Hillclimb Valle de Bravo-Bosencheve in Mexico, in a fatal accident after his  McLaren went wide in a bend and hit a concrete trimming on the edge of the road, overturning the car which landed on top of him and caught fire. The Solana family is still very active in motor racing and has manufactured handmade sports cars on a mostly one-off basis.

The first chicane at the Autodromo Hermanos Rodriguez in Mexico City (Turns 1-3) are known as the Ese Moisés Solana ("the Moises Solana Esses").

Complete Formula One World Championship results 
(key)

References

External links
 Moisés Solana biography on Solana family official website

1935 births
1969 deaths
Mexican racing drivers
Mexican Formula One drivers
European Formula Two Championship drivers
Racing drivers who died while racing
Scuderia Centro Sud Formula One drivers
Team Lotus Formula One drivers
Cooper Formula One drivers
World Sportscar Championship drivers
Sport deaths in Mexico
Carrera Panamericana drivers